Ilyas Imranovich Shurpayev (25 July 1975, Makhachkala – 21 March 2008, Moscow) was a Russian television journalist and Channel One (Russia) correspondent.

Life and career
Shurpayev was born in Makhachkala, Dagestan, and graduated from a local university with a specialization in philology. He worked for Channel One and mostly served in Russia's North Caucasus region, including Dagestan and Chechnya.

Death
On 21 March 2008, Shurpayev was found dead in his apartment in Moscow with stab wounds and a belt around his neck. A fire was set in the apartment after the attack, and a sum of money was stolen. Hours before his death, Shurpayev wrote a blog post, entitled "Now I am a dissident!", saying that the owners of a Dagestan newspaper had banned his column and told its staff not to mention his name in publications.

The investigations committee of the Russian prosecutor's office opened a criminal case into the murder.

On the night he was murdered, he asked the concierge to admit two young men to his building, saying they were his guests. A week later it was reported that Shurpayev met them in a park known as a popular place for gay liaisons. The two suspects were Tajikistani, and one of them had served a term for robbery. Both men fled to Tajikistan.

On 30 July 2008, two Tajikistani citizens, 25-year-old Masrudzhon Yatimov and 21-year-old Nadzhmiddin Mukhiddinov, were found guilty of Shurpayev's murder by the Supreme Court of Tajikistan and sentenced to 21 years imprisonment each. Both admitted their guilt.

References

1975 births
2008 deaths
People from Makhachkala
Assassinated Russian journalists
Journalists killed in Russia
People murdered in Russia
20th-century Russian journalists